The Arado Ar 66 was a German single-engined, two-seat training biplane, developed in 1933. It was also used for night ground-attack missions on the Eastern Front. It was engineer Walter Rethel's last design in collaboration with Arado, before Walter Blume, assigned as Arado Flugzeugwerke's chief design engineer in 1933, took over the bulk of the Arado firm's design duties.

Design and development
Arado's chief designer Walter Rethel started design of a new two-seat trainer in 1931, with the design being developed by Walter Blume when Rethel transferred to Messerschmitt, with the first prototype, the Ar 66a flying in 1932.

The Ar 66 had an Argus As 10 air-cooled inverted V8 engine producing about 179 kW (240 hp), which drove a 2.5 m (8.2 ft) two-blade propeller. It carried 205 L (54 US gal) of fuel, and 17 L (4 US gal) of oil.

The fuselage had an oval cross-section and was made of welded steel tubes, covered with fabric. The double wings provided very high lift, even at low speeds. Both wings had the same span and an 8° sweep. Construction consisted of a double pine wing spar structure, with lime tree ribs, and fabric covering. There were ailerons in both the upper and lower wings. The tail had a conventional design, with the horizontal stabilizers mounted on the fuselage upper edge. The rudder was placed behind the elevators. Both the rudder and the elevators were of steel tube covered in fabric, and had a bigger surface than the first version to correct balance problems. The steel tube undercarriage was attached to the fuselage in a "V" shape and used high-pressure rubber suspension.

The crew consisted of two: instructor pilot and trainee, seated in open tandem cockpits, equipped with dual controls. The aircraft was equipped with instrument flight systems with photographic cameras were mounted as optional equipment.

Operational history
The Ar 66 entered service with the Luftwaffe in 1933, serving as a trainer until well into World War II. In 1943, the Luftwaffe set up a number of night harassment groups to operate on the Russian front. The Ar 66, along with the Gotha Go 145, formed the main equipment of these groups.

Variants
Data from Aircraft of the Third Reich
Ar 66a Prototype
Ar 66b 2nd prototype completed as a floatplane
Ar 66B Production Seaplane version of Ar 66C. Two large steel hollow floats, braced with iron cable. About ten were constructed and used for seaplane training.
Ar 66C Series production model with modified elevators, larger rudder, and larger-diameter wheels.

Operators

Czechoslovakian Air Force (Postwar)

Luftwaffe
Nachtschlachtgruppe 2
Nachtschlachtgruppe 3
Nachtschlachtgruppe 5
Nachtschlachtgruppe 8
Nachtschlachtgruppe 12

Spanish Air Force

Specifications (Ar 66C)

See also

References

Bibliography
 Gerdessen, Frederik. "Estonian Air Power 1918 – 1945". Air Enthusiast, No. 18, April – July 1982. pp. 61–76. .

External links

 Arado Ar 66c

Biplanes
Single-engined tractor aircraft
1930s German military trainer aircraft
Ar 066
Aircraft first flown in 1932